Bethwell is a masculine given name of Kenyan origin. It is a variant of the biblical name Bethuel. Notable people with the name include:

Bethwell Allan Ogot (born 1929), Kenyan historian
Bethwell Birgen (born 1988), Kenyan middle-distance runner
Bethwell Kiplagat, Kenyan jurist, ambassador and chair of The Truth, Justice and Reconciliation Commission of Kenya
Bethwell Kipchumba Kaptildil legend

Kenyan names
Masculine given names